Glenn Moss Rogers (born January 24, 1956) is an American veterinarian, rancher and politician. He has represented the 60th District in the Texas House of Representatives since 2021. A member of the Republican Party, Rogers also owns and operates the Holt River Ranch near Graford, Texas.

Early life, education, and career
Rogers graduated from Graham High School. He then attended Texas A&M University, where he received a BS and then D.V.M. from the College of Veterinary Medicine & Biomedical Sciences in 1980. After college he opened up a rural mixed veterinary practice in Graham and Graford, Texas. During this time, Rogers served as president of the Palo Pinto County Farm Bureau and as a school board member for Graham Independent School District. In the 1990s Rogers attended Kansas State University and earned a MS in Beef Production Medicine. He became an associate professor at North Carolina State University until 2000, when he returned to the ranch.

Rogers was awarded Conservation Rancher of the Year Award for the State of Texas in 2017.

Holt River Ranch
The ranch has been in the Rogers family since 1906, which is located near Graham, alongside the Brazos River. Glenn began ranching on the ranch in 1980 and moved his practice to the ranch in 1986. Originally referred to as River Ranch, until Glenn's son, Franklin Holt Rogers, died from an automobile accident in 1993. The ranch develops and market 800 heifer annually.

Election
Rogers announced in September 2019 to run for the Texas House of Representatives District 60 seat, that was being held by Mike Lang at the time. Representative Lang announced in around the same time, that he would not seek re-election for the 87th legislature. Lang then reversed his statements two days later, which did not stop Rogers from running. Rogers defeated Jon Francis in the 2020 Republican Primary Runoff with 51% of the vote in July 2020. He ran unopposed in the November 2020 election. Governor Greg Abbott had endorsed Rogers prior the July runoff election. Rogers also received endorsements from Rick Perry and Mike Conaway as well.

References

External links
 Campaign website
 State legislative page

1956 births
Living people
Republican Party members of the Texas House of Representatives
21st-century American politicians
Texas A&M University alumni
Kansas State University alumni
People from Palo Pinto County, Texas
American veterinarians
Male veterinarians